Frithjof Seidel (born 28 May 1997) is a German diver. In 2015, he won the bronze medal in the men's 3 metre synchronized springboard event at the 2015 European Games held in Baku, Azerbaijan, alongside Nico Herzog.

He competed in the men's 1 m springboard event at the 2016 European Aquatics Championships held in London, United Kingdom. He did not advance to compete in the final.

In 2019, he won the silver medal in both the men's 1 metre springboard events at the 2019 Summer Universiade held in Naples, Italy. In the same year, he competed in the men's 1 metre springboard event at the 2019 World Aquatics Championships held in Gwangju, South Korea. He did not advance to compete in the final.

References 

Living people
1997 births
Place of birth missing (living people)
German male divers
Divers at the 2015 European Games
European Games medalists in diving
European Games bronze medalists for Germany
Universiade medalists in diving
Universiade silver medalists for Germany
Competitors at the 2017 Summer Universiade
Medalists at the 2019 Summer Universiade
21st-century German people
German synchronized swimmers
Artistic swimmers at the 2022 World Aquatics Championships
Sportspeople from Halle (Saale)
Male synchronized swimmers